Pixie Lamm Coolidge (March 4, 1948 – November 28, 2017) was an American professional tennis player.

Lamm was born in Hartford, Connecticut and moved to California during her childhood. She partnered up with Rosie Casals in 1963 to win the national 16s and under doubles championships, before going on to claim the California state junior title in the 18s age division. In 1968 she made the singles second rounds at both the Wimbledon Championships and the US Open. She was a collegiate tennis player and team captain for the UCLA Bruins. In 1970 she earned a place on the United States team to compete at the Summer Universiade in Italy.

References

External links
 
 

1948 births
2017 deaths
American female tennis players
UCLA Bruins women's tennis players
Tennis people from California
Competitors at the 1970 Summer Universiade
Sportspeople from Hartford, Connecticut